The coat of arms of the University of Cambridge in Cambridge, England, is blazoned: Gules, on a cross ermine between four lions passant guardant Or, a Bible lying fesseways of the field, clasped and garnished of the third, the clasps in base.
Or in layman's terms:

The arms were granted at the 1573 visitation of the County of Cambridge undertaken by Robert Cooke, the then Clarenceux King of Arms, and a graduate of St John's College. The lions represent the university's royal patronage, the ermine represents dignity, and the Bible on the cross represents both knowledge and the Christian faith.

The motto is not a fixed or necessary component of the arms, but the motto generally used by the university is Hinc lucem et pocula sacra, Latin for "From here, light and sacred draughts". This derives from an emblem traditionally used by the University Press, featuring the alma mater ("nourishing mother") of Cambridge with a sun in one hand, representing enlightenment, and in the other a cup collecting droplets from the sky, representing spiritual sustenance.

See also

Armorial of UK universities
University of Cambridge

References

Culture of the University of Cambridge
Cambridge
Cambridge University
Cambridge University
Cambridge University